The Derby South services are two service stations run by Welcome Break on either side of the A50 road. The services are located in South Derbyshire, near the villages of Shardlow and Aston-on-Trent.

References

External links 
Welcome Break Motorway Services - Derby - A50 Trunk road

Transport in Derbyshire
Welcome Break motorway service stations